Éric Battista (born 14 May 1933) is a French former triple jumper who competed in the 1956 Summer Olympics, in the 1960 Summer Olympics, and in the 1964 Summer Olympics.

References

People from Sète
1933 births
Living people
French male triple jumpers
Olympic athletes of France
Athletes (track and field) at the 1956 Summer Olympics
Athletes (track and field) at the 1960 Summer Olympics
Athletes (track and field) at the 1964 Summer Olympics
Sportspeople from Hérault
Mediterranean Games gold medalists for France
Mediterranean Games medalists in athletics
Athletes (track and field) at the 1955 Mediterranean Games
Athletes (track and field) at the 1959 Mediterranean Games